= At the Limits of Cure =

2021 book by Bharat Jayram Venkat

- Cover of the 2021 Duke University Press edition
- Authors: Bharat Jayram Venkat
- Language: English
- Subjects: Anthropology history of science
- Publisher: Duke University Press
- Publication date: 2021
- Publication place: USA
- Media type: Print (hardcover, Paperback)
- Pages: 304
- Awards: Joseph W. Elder Prize in the Indian Social Science (2019); Edie Turner Prize (2023); Wellcome Medal (2022).
- ISBN: 978-1-4780-1379-2

At the Limits of Cure is a 2021 book by the historian and anthropologist Bharat Jayram Venkat, published by Duke University Press. The book addresses the treatment of tuberculosis through ethnography and the history of science. The book received the Joseph W. Elder Prize in the Indian Social Science, was awarded the Royal Anthropological Institute's Wellcome Medal, and received the Society for Humanistic Anthropology's Edie Turner First Book Prize in Ethnographic Writing.

== Reception ==
Catriona Ellis, reviewing the book in the Journal of the History of Medicine and Allied Sciences, wrote that it is "a sensitive interplay of the scientific and the personal" and said that the book "demonstrates a repeating pattern of new discovery of cure, whether medical or environmental, followed by wider expansion and then gradual disappointment as each attempt fails to reach its initial promise." Ellis wrote that some of the arguments Venkat makes are "inferred rather than systematically developed".

Kiran Kumbhar, writing in Contributions to Indian Sociology, said that "Venkat offers meticulously argued insights into cure as a concept, employing a diverse array of methods including archival research, literary and film analysis, and ethnography".

Zahra Hayat, in a review for Medical Anthropology Quarterly, wrote that "Venkat expands the category of cure in fundamental ways, showing how cure confronts myriad limits". Hayat said that At The Limits of Cure "unsettles the normative opposition between the chronic and the curable".

Amit Prasad described the book as "extraordinary" in a review for Technology & Culture, praising Venkat for how he "deftly interweaves history and mythology, archival material and ethnography, patient case histories and India's political history" in his discussion of what it means to cure.

Thomas Cousins, reviewing the book in Critical Global Health: Evidence, Efficacy, Ethnography, called the book "brilliant" and wrote that " Venkat’s critique of curative reason helps to bring squarely into view the question of how else we might imagine cure, and thus, health". Cousins described the book as "essential reading for clinicians, public health officials, historians, and medical anthropologists".

=== Awards ===
- American Institute of Indian Studies's Joseph W. Elder Prize in the Indian Social Science (2019).
- Royal Anthropological Institute's Wellcome Medal (2022).
- Shortlist for the British Association for South Asian Studies Book Prize (2023).
- Society for Humanistic Anthropology's Edie Turner First Book Prize in Ethnographic Writing (2023).
